James McQueen (1934–1998) was an Australian novelist and short story writer.

Life and work 
Born in Ulverstone, Tasmania, McQueen had a variety of jobs, studied at the National Art School in Sydney, and completed a four-year course in accountancy. He began writing fiction in 1975, and wrote full-time from 1977, living in Nabowla, north-eastern Tasmania, near Scottsdale.

He wrote more than 150 stories, which were published in various countries as well as numerous Australian periodicals before being collected in six volumes. He wrote five novels for adults, as well as books for younger readers and non-fiction works. He and his second wife Barbara grew orchids professionally, and wrote two books about orchids together.

He was arrested while protesting against the proposed Franklin River dam. The theme of environmental activism is strong in his novel Hook’s Mountain and some of his other works. Other recurring themes include the nature of masculinity and the inevitability of violence.

After a discussion of McQueen's work, the literary critic Laurie Clancy said, "Although the best of his short stories are very fine, McQueen's limitations tend to be exposed more in the novels, with their formulaic characterizations."

He and his first wife Rosemary had a daughter and a son.

Novels 
 A Just Equinox (1980)
 Hook's Mountain (1982)
 The Floor of Heaven (1986)
 White Light (1990)
 The Heavy Knife (1991)

White Light and The Heavy Knife were the first two novels of an uncompleted trilogy, The Clocks of Death.

Short story collections 
 The Electric Beach (1978)
 The Escape Machine (1981)
 Uphill Runner (1984)
 Death of a Ladies' Man (1989)
 Lower Latitudes (1990)
 Travels with Michael and Me (1992)

Children's and young adult fiction 
 Escape to Danger (1979)
 The Night of the Crocodile (1997)
 The Candelaria Massacre (1997) 
 Dead Reckoning (1999)
 Stranger (1999)
 Snake Island (1999)

Non-fiction 
 Miniature Orchids (1992) (with Barbara McQueen) 
 Orchids of Brazil (1993) (with Barbara McQueen)
 The Franklin: Not Just a River (1983)

References

External links 
 James McQueen resources at the National Library of Australia

1934 births
1998 deaths
20th-century Australian novelists
Australian male novelists
Australian male short story writers
Writers from Tasmania
20th-century Australian short story writers
20th-century Australian male writers